The 1978 All-Africa Games football tournament was the 3rd edition of the African Games men's football tournament. The football tournament was held in Algiers, Algeria between 13–28 July 1978 as part of the 1978 All-Africa Games.

Qualification

The following countries have qualified for the final tournament

Squads

Venues

Final tournament
The eight teams were divided into two groups of three teams. The two top teams from each group played the semifinals before the final match.

All times given as local time (UTC+1)

Group stage

Group A

 

 

 

 

 

1 The match was abandoned due to a mass brawl involving both teams, their officials, and fans. Libya were ejected from the competition, while Egypt withdrew after a number of their players were injured and to protest the brutality of the Algerian police and stadium security.

Group B

Knockout stage

Semifinals

Bronze-medal match

Gold-medal match

Final ranking

External links
All-African Games 1978 - rsssf.com

 
1978
1978 All-Africa Games
All-Africa Games
All-Africa Games